The Ministry of Communications (Misrad HaTikshoret) is the Israeli government ministry responsible for Communications in Israel. It is a relatively minor position in the cabinet. The ministry was established in 1952, and until 1970 was known as the Ministry of Postal Services (Misrad HaDo'ar).

List of ministers
The Communications Minister of Israel (Sar HaTikshoret) is the political head of the ministry. There is occasionally a Deputy Minister.

Deputy ministers

External links
All Ministers in the Ministry of Communications Knesset website
Israel Ministry of Communications site in English
Radio Type Approval Services for Israel

Communications
Ministry of Communications
Communications
 
Israel